Weinbaum is a Germanic surname. Notable people with the name include:

 Batya Weinbaum (born 1952), American poet, feminist, artist, editor, and professor
 Sheldon Weinbaum (born 1937), American biomedical engineer
 Stanley G. Weinbaum (1902–1935), American science fiction writer

Other uses
 Weinbaum (crater), impact crater in the Mare Australe quadrangle of Mars

German-language surnames
Jewish surnames
Yiddish-language surnames